Tudo foi Feito pelo Sol is the sixth album by the Brazilian rock band Os Mutantes. The only original member of the band to take part in the recording of this album was guitarist Sérgio Dias.

Track listing

Bonus tracks on CD reissue

These three tracks comprise an EP issued in 1976.

Personnel
 Sérgio Dias: electric and acoustic guitars, vocals, sitar
 Antônio Pedro: bass guitar, vocals
 Rui Motta: drums, percussion
 Túlio Mourão: Hammond organ, piano, Minimoog, vocals

References

1974 albums
Os Mutantes albums